Barbara Alison Jones  is a New Zealand academic who works in the field of sociology of education. She is the great-great-great granddaughter of Andrew Buchanan, New Zealand politician 1862–1874; great-great granddaughter of William Baldwin New Zealand politician 1863–1867; great granddaughter of Admiral William Oswald Story of the British Royal Navy. She has two sons, Finn McCahon Jones and Frey McCahon Jones

Education and career
Jones studied at Auckland for her Doctor of Education, entitled "'At School I've Got a Chance...': social reproduction in a New Zealand secondary school".

In 2005, she was promoted to Professor in Te Puna Wānanga, School of Māori and Indigenous Education at the University of Auckland.

In 2014, she won the Dame Joan Metge medal. She was selected as one of the Royal Society Te Apārangi's 150 women in 150 words in 2017.

In the 2019 New Year Honours, Jones was appointed a Member of the New Zealand Order of Merit, for services to education and sociology research.

Publications
Her books include 'At school I've Got a Chance': Pacific Islands and Pākehā girls at school (1991), He Kōrero: Words Between Us: First Māori Pākehā conversations on paper (2011), and Tuai: A Traveller in Two Worlds (2017) which won the 2018 Ockham New Zealand Book Award for Illustrated Non-Fiction. Her 2020 memoir, This Pākehā Life, was shortlisted for the 2021 Ockham New Zealand Book Award (General Nonfiction).

References

External links
 institutional homepage

Living people
New Zealand women academics
Members of the New Zealand Order of Merit
University of Auckland alumni
Academic staff of the University of Auckland
New Zealand sociologists
New Zealand women writers
Year of birth missing (living people)